The Calkins-Orvis House is a historic house located at 210 West Nichols Street in Welsh, Louisiana.

Built in 1901, it is a one-and-a-half-story Queen Anne-style house. It is asserted to have "local architectural significance as a landmark in the turn-of-the-century residential heritage of Welsh. This status is based upon its unusual massing (most notably the distinctive treatment of its side gables) and its profusion of intricate shinglework."

The house was listed on the National Register of Historic Places on May 8, 1998.

See also
 National Register of Historic Places listings in Jefferson Davis Parish, Louisiana

References

Houses on the National Register of Historic Places in Louisiana
Queen Anne architecture in Louisiana
Houses completed in 1901
Jefferson Davis Parish, Louisiana